Age International is a UK-based charity focusing on older people in developing countries. It works in over 30 low and middle-income countries. It was founded on 24 April 2012 by Age UK and HelpAge International. The charity's working name is Age International, but the legal name of the charity is HelpAge International UK. The director of the charity is Chris Roles. Chris Roles holds a blog on the Huffington Post, where he has previously blogged about a number of topics related to ageing, including: 
 Preventing HIV and Aids in Older People Across the World.  
 Why Does Witchcraft-related Abuse of Older People Still Happen in 2016?   
 Long-Term Health Support More Vital Than Ever on Fifth Anniversary of Syrian Conflict 
 Why Is the World Humanitarian Summit Important for Older People? 

The charity focuses on four priority areas of work: poverty reduction; improving health; protecting rights; and emergency relief.

Vision

Relationship with Age UK and HelpAge International 
Age International is a charitable subsidiary of Age UK and is a registered charity linked to Age UK. 
It is the UK affiliate of the HelpAge Global Network – a network of over 100  ageing organisations in more than 70 countries.
As the UK affiliate of HelpAge, Age International raises awareness of HelpAge's work in the UK, raises funds in the UK, and carries out influencing and campaigning work in the UK to change global policies and practices.

Emergency Work 
Age International is a member of the Disasters Emergency Committee (DEC). It is the only aid organisation within the DEC to specifically target older people in emergencies. 
According to Age International, 26 million older people are affected by disasters every year. In 2014-15 Age International reached 155,000 older people in 23 countries with emergency response and recovery programmes.

Since 2012, Age International has responded to 7 DEC appeals: the Philippines Typhoon; the Gaza crisis; the Syria crisis; the Ebola crisis; the Nepal earthquake; the Yemen crisis; and the East Africa Crisis.

Publications 

In 2015, Age International published "Facing The Facts: the truth about ageing and development". This publication is a collection of essays which discuss the impact of an ageing world on international development.

In 2016, Age International and HelpAge International published "Older Citizen Monitoring: Achievements and learning". OCM involves older people monitoring the implementation of policies and services affecting their lives, and using evidence they gather to advocate for change at local, national and international levels. This report offers insight into the HelpAge network's experience of OCM since 2002.

Celebrity Links 
A number of celebrities are affiliated with Age International, including Penny Smith, Nick Sharratt, Martina Navratilova, Sir Antony Gormley, Miriam Margolyes  and Jane Fearnley-Whittingstall.

A number of high-profile politicians, academics and development experts also support the work of Age International, including Baroness Barker, Lord Foulkes, Baroness Northover, Baroness Greengross, Dr.Margaret Chan, Mary Robinson, Martin Prince, Peter Lloyd-Sherlock, Nora Groce, Penny Vera-Sanso, Jane Falkingham, Duncan Green, Jonathan Glennie and Craig Mokhiber.

Age International's photo competition and exhibition  
In 2016, Age International held a photo competition and exhibition entitled 'Strength for Life'. The organisation asked for both amateur and professional photographers to submit photos that depicted strength in older age. The winning photos were exhibited at St Martin-in-the-Fields in London. 

Alongside the winning photos, the organisation also exhibited a series of photos entitled ‘The Missing Generation of Myanmar’, from awarding-winning Guardian photographer, David Levene. These photos were also published in the Guardian with an article about older people caring for their grandchildren when their parents migrate to find work and the work Age International is doing to support them.

References

External links 

Age International Annual Review 2014-2015
Age International Annual Review 2015-2016
Age International Annual Report 2014-2015
Age International Annual Report 2015-2016
Age International and Helpage International report on Older Citizen Monitoring
 Age International (HelpAge International UK), registered charity number 1128267-8 linked to Age UK
Disasters Emergency Committee (DEC)
HelpAge International UK
Age UK
"Urgent health needs in Gaza", The Huffington Post
 "How your clothes can restore sight in Ethiopia", The Huffington Post
"Age International's Managing Director, Chris Roles, blogs on the Huffington Post", The Huffington Post
"Poor monitoring renders millions of older people invisible", The Guardian
"Nine countries where it is better to grow old than the UK", The Telegraph
"Afghanistan the worst place to grow old- global index", Thomson Reuters Foundation
"Why don't we care about older people as much as children?" , The Guardian
"Urgent need to deal with the rapid rise in numbers of older people", The Guardian
"Chris Roles on working towards a convention on the rights of older people", UNA-UK
"Ageism is baseless: we need a human rights convention for older people", The Guardian
"Obtaining a truly inclusive framework for future generations", devex

Development charities based in the United Kingdom
Charities for the elderly based in the United Kingdom